The Canary Islands Seamount Province (CISP) is located in the Atlantic Ocean between 23º and 33º north. It comprises the seven major islands of the Canary Islands archipelago, the two islets of the Savage Islands and 16 seamounts scattered along an area of  km2 parallel to the northwestern coastline of the African Continent. Besides its geographical distribution, the components of the province share a series of geochemical similarities.

Three different alignments have been described within the CISP:

 A SW-NE stretch going from the Tropic Seamount to the westernmost point of the Canarian archipelago.
 A central NNO-ESE stretch from the Canarian islands of La Palma and El Hierro to the island of Fuerteventura (400 km long).
 The so-called Canary Ridge, initially following SO-NE direction from Fuerteventura to the Concepción Bank, and from there following a S-N direction from the Concepción Bank to the Essaouira Seamount.

Seamounts 

 Echo Seamount
 Tropic Seamount
 Concepción Bank
 Tagoro
 The Paps

References

Bibliography 
 

Geography of the Canary Islands
Atlantic Ocean